Sir Thomas Wyse  (24 December 1791 – 16 April 1862), an Irish politician and diplomat, belonged to a family claiming descent from a Devon squire, Andrew Wyse, who is said to have crossed over to Ireland during the reign of Henry II and obtained lands near Waterford, of which city thirty-three members of the family are said to have been mayors or other municipal officers: one, John Wyse,  was Chief Baron of the Irish Exchequer in the 1490s.

Life
From the Reformation the family had been consistently attached to the Catholic Church. Wyse was educated at Stonyhurst College and at Trinity College Dublin, where he distinguished himself as a scholar. After 1815 he passed some years in travel, visiting Italy, Greece, Egypt and Palestine. In 1821 he married Princess Letizia Bonaparte (1804–1871), daughter of Lucien Bonaparte, and after residing for a time at Viterbo he returned to Ireland in 1825, having by this time inherited the family estates.

He now devoted his great oratorical and other talents to forwarding the cause of Catholic emancipation, and his influence was specially marked in his own county of Waterford, while his standing among his associates was shown by his being chosen to write the address to the people of England.

In 1830, after the passing of the Catholic Relief Act 1829, he was returned to parliament for the Tipperary constituency, and he attached himself to the Whig Party and voted for the great measures of the reform era. But he was specially anxious to secure some improvement in the education of the Irish people, and some of his proposals were accepted by Edward Stanley, later 14th Earl of Derby, and the government, he was chairman of a committee which inquired into the condition of education in Ireland, and it was partly owing to his efforts that provincial colleges were established at Cork, Galway and Belfast.

His work as an educational pioneer also bore fruit in England, where the principles of state control and inspection, for which he had fought, were adopted, and where a training college for teachers at Battersea was established on lines suggested by him. From 1835 to 1847 he was MP for the Waterford City constituency, from 1839 to 1841 he was a Lord of the Treasury, from 1846 to 1849 he was Secretary to the Board of Control, and in 1849 he was sent as British minister to Greece.  In that capacity he was a major figure in the notorious Don Pacifico Incident. He was very successful in his diplomacy, and he showed a great interest in the educational and other internal affairs of Greece. In 1857 he was made a KCB, and he died at Athens on 16 April 1862.

Wyse wrote Historical Sketch of the late Catholic Association of Ireland (London 1829), Education reform or the necessity of a national system of education (London 1836), An Excursion in the Peloponnesus (1858, new ed. 1865), and Impressions of Greece (London 1871).

His two sons shared his literary tastes: They were Napoleon Alfred Bonaparte-Wyse (1822–1895) and William Charles Bonaparte-Wyse (1826–1892), a student of the dialect of Provence. The marriage to his wife Letizia, thirteen years younger than he and only sixteen years old when the wedding took place, did not last. After an especially violent fight in 1824 (so fierce that their carriage rocked on its springs), she fled to a convent and asked for a separation. Wyse and Letizia got a papal order of seclusion in the convent. After eight months, when Wyse threatened to leave Italy without her, she submitted and travelled to Ireland with him.

However the arguments continued and in May 1828 they agreed to a separation. Letizia threw herself in a suicide attempt into the Serpentine and was rescued by Captain Studholme John Hodgson (1805–1890), a British Army officer who became her lover. They had three children who survived to adulthood: the writer Marie Laetitia Bonaparte-Wyse (1831–1902, called secretly Studholmina-Maria) who was known as Princess Marie de Solms in her first marriage; Adeline (1838–1899), who married in 1861 the Hungarian general István Türr; and the explorer Lucien Napoléon Bonaparte-Wyse (1845–1909).  All of them married and left children; all the children of Captain Hodgson and Princess Letizia used the surname Bonaparte-Wyse.

Wyse was the subject of a biography written by James Auchmuty, Sir Thomas Wyse, 1791–1862: the life and career of an educator and diplomat, London 1939.

Family and children
Wyse married Princess Letizia Bonaparte, daughter of Lucien Bonaparte and his second wife Alexandrine de Bleschamp, in 1821. Their children were:

 Napoleon Alfred Bonaparte-Wyse (1822–1895);
 William Bonaparte-Wyse (1826-1892);
 Marie Bonaparte-Wyse (1831-1902);
 Adelina Bonaparte Wyse (1838–1899), married to István Türr;
 Lucien Bonaparte-Wyse (1845-1909).

References

Sources

External links
 Bonaparte Wyse Waterford Museum of Treasures in "Ask about Ireland"

 

1791 births
1862 deaths
Alumni of Trinity College Dublin
Ambassadors of the United Kingdom to Greece
Knights Commander of the Order of the Bath
Members of the Parliament of the United Kingdom for County Tipperary constituencies (1801–1922)
Members of the Parliament of the United Kingdom for County Waterford constituencies (1801–1922)
Members of the Privy Council of the United Kingdom
People educated at Stonyhurst College
People from County Waterford
Politicians from County Waterford
UK MPs 1830–1831
UK MPs 1831–1832
UK MPs 1835–1837
UK MPs 1837–1841
UK MPs 1841–1847
Whig (British political party) MPs for Irish constituencies
Committee members of the Society for the Diffusion of Useful Knowledge